The Garter Principal King of Arms (also Garter King of Arms or simply Garter) is the senior King of Arms, and the senior Officer of Arms of the College of Arms, the heraldic authority with jurisdiction over England, Wales and Northern Ireland. The position has existed since 1415.

Garter is responsible to the Earl Marshal for the running of the college. He is the principal adviser to the sovereign of the United Kingdom with respect to ceremonial and heraldry, with specific responsibility for England, Wales and Northern Ireland, and, with the exception of Canada, for Commonwealth realms of which the King is Sovereign. He also serves as the King of Arms of the Order of the Garter and his seal and signature appear on all grants of arms made by the college.

On the death of the British monarch it is the Garter's duty to proclaim the new monarch. Initially, the Accession Council meets at St James's Palace in central London to declare the new monarch from the deceased monarch's line. Once the new monarch has made a sacred oath before the council, Garter King of Arms steps out into the Proclamation Gallery which overlooks Friary Court to proclaim the new monarch.

The current Garter Principal King of Arms is David White.

History

Foundation 
William Bruges, the first Garter King of Arms, held the office by 1417. The exact date of his appointment is not known and no record of it survives. John Anstis discovered a royal warrant under the Privy Seal dated 22 May in the fifth year of the reign of King Henry V (1417) wherein Bruges is called by his previous title, Guyenne King of Arms; the warrant orders that another be passed under the Great Seal of the Realm protecting Bruges while he travelled abroad with the king. Anstis then outlines two further pieces of evidence: (1) an instrument of 1422 or 1423 by which Bruges settled pension arrangements with the knights in which it is stated that he was appointed Garter at a previous full chapter meeting, and (2) a decree by the Duke of Clarence dated either 3 or 13 September 1417 which mentions "Garretier Roy d'armes des Anghis" As Henry V left for France on 27 July 1417, it can be deduced that Bruges must have been appointed in late July of that year. 

This was accepted until Hugh Stanford London published evidence which appeared to date Bruges' appointment two years earlier than Anstis suggested. William Bruges' father, Richard, left a will dated 4 July 1415 and split into two parts: a testament dealing with his burial, charitable bequests and legacies to his wife, and a voluntas, which dealt with personal bequests. Although the testament (recorded in the London registry) makes no mention of anyone other than Richard's wife, the voluntas (copied in Archbishop Henry Chichele's registers) makes mention of his children. Reference is made to his son William, variously called "Gien", "Gyen" and "Gartere", and William's wife, called "Agnes Garter". The other register entries around the voluntas date to 1418 and 1419, so E. F. Jacob, the editor of a printed version of the register, suggests that the references to Garter may be a later gloss. But, Stanford London argued that later annotations would be consistent and refer to him as either Garter and Guyenne or simply Garter throughout, while Agnes would not have been called just Garter if it were a gloss. Instead, he suggests that Richard forgot to call his newly appointed son Garter at first and later included it alongside his old title in the will.

Criticising this point, Peter Begent finds no reference to Bruges being called anything but Guyenne or the equivalent title of Aquitaine King of Arms in records between 1415 and 1417, which is problematic for Stanford London's position. He argues that it is entirely possible that, if not a gloss, the voluntas was edited after 1415 as Richard Bruges included more bequests to his family.

Later history 
The Garter Principal King of Arms was placed by King Henry V over all the whole body of heralds.

He may be said to have two distinct capacities united in his person, one relative to the Order of the Garter, the other as head of the College of Arms, and on this account he not only takes an oath in a chapter of the Garter, before the Sovereign and Knights, but as king at arms another oath before the Earl Marshal, and therefore he is styled both principal officer of arms of the most noble order of the Garter and principal king of English arms.

He has power to appoint a herald for his deputy: he must be a native of England and a gentleman bearing arms. It was anciently held that he was to be neither a knight nor a clergyman; but there has been one instance of a Garter having been a foreigner; and since the reign of Henry VII many of them have received knighthood: one was created a knight of the Bath. The office entitles him to the privilege of correcting errors or usurpations in all armorial bearings, to grant arms to such who deserve them, to present to the House of Lords a genealogy of every new peer, to assign his place in the chamber of parliament and to give him and the knights of the Bath supporters.

Coat of arms
The official arms of the Garter Principal King of Arms were in use by around 1520. They are Argent a Cross Gules on a Chief Azure a crown enclosed in a Garter between a lion passant guardant and a fleur de lis all Or.

Funding
In addition to the official annual salary paid by the Crown of £49.07, HM Treasury pays Garter King of Arms for work undertaken for the Government. As of 27 January 2021, the payments made to Thomas Woodcock, since his appointment as Garter totalled £651,515.  Additionally, since 2018, the Treasury has provided Garter with an expenses fund of £35,000 per annum to cover business expenses such as secretarial support, cleaning and postage. As of 27 January 2021, Garter has received £74,579.02 to cover expenses.

Holders of the office

Portraits

List

See also

 King of Arms
 Lord Lyon King of Arms
 Order of the Garter
 College of Arms
 English heraldry

References
Notes

Citations

Bibliography

 Adolph, Anthony R. J. S. (2004a). "Dethick, Sir Gilbert (1499/1500–1584)". Oxford Dictionary of National Biography. Oxford University Press.
 Adolph, Anthony R. J. S. (2004b). "Dethick, Sir William (1543–1612)". Oxford Dictionary of National Biography. Oxford University Press.
 Adolph, Anthony R. J. S. (2004c). "Segar, Sir William (b. in or before 1564, d. 1633)". Oxford Dictionary of National Biography. Oxford University Press.
 Ailes, Adrian (1998). "The creation of the office of Garter king of arms: a postscript". Coat of Arms. New Series. vol. 11. issue 182. pp. 239–240
 Ailes, Adrian (2004a). "Bruges, William (c.1375–1450)". Oxford Dictionary of National Biography. Oxford University Press.
 Ailes, Adrian (2004b). "Wagner, Sir Anthony Richard (1908–1995)". Oxford Dictionary of National Biography. Oxford University Press.
 Ailes, Adrian (2004c). "Writhe, John (d. 1504)". Oxford Dictionary of National Biography. Oxford University Press.
 Ailes, Adrian (January 2008). "Anstis, John (1708–1754)". Oxford Dictionary of National Biography. Oxford University Press.
 Anstis, John (1742). The Register of the Most Noble Order of the Garter. London: John Barber (printer). 2 vols.: 1, 2.
 Baron, S. A. (May 2011). "Borough, Sir John (d. 1643)". Oxford Dictionary of National Biography. Oxford University Press.
 Begent, P. J. (1995). "The Creation of the Office of Garter King of Arms". Coat of Arms. New Series. vol. 11. issue 172. pp. 134–140
 Cheesman, C. E. A. (2004). "Leake, Stephen Martin (1702–1773)". Oxford Dictionary of National Biography. Oxford University Press.
 Chesshyre, Hubert (May 2011). "Walker, Sir Edward (1612–1677)". Oxford Dictionary of National Biography. Oxford University Press. 
 Cooper, Thompson; Marchand, J. A. (rev.) (2004). "Browne, Thomas (1702–1780)". Oxford Dictionary of National Biography. Oxford University Press.
 Cooper, Thompson; Marchand, J. A. (rev.) (January 2008). "Townley, Sir Charles (1713–1774)". Oxford Dictionary of National Biography. Oxford University Press.
 Crossette, J. S. (1983). "Bysshe, Edward (c.1615-79), of Smallfield Place, Burstow, Surr.". The History of Parliament: the House of Commons 1660-1690. London: Secker & Warburg (for the History of Parliament Trust).
 Cruickshanks, Eveline (1970). "Anstis, John (1669-1744), of West North, Duloe, Cornw.". The History of Parliament: the House of Commons 1715-1754. London: H.M.S.O (for the History of Parliament Trust).
 Cruickshanks, Eveline (2002). "Anstis, John (1669-1744), of West Duloe, Cornw. and Arundel Street, Norfolk Buildings, Westminster". The History of Parliament: the House of Commons 1690-1715. Cambridge: Cambridge University Press (for the History of Parliament Trust).
 Davidson, Alan; Thrush, Andrew (2010). "Borough (Burgh, Burroughes), John (1583-1643), of Old Palace Yard, Westminster". The History of Parliament: the House of Commons 1604-1629. Cambridge: Cambridge University Press (for the History of Parliament Trust).
 Dickinson, P. L. (Jan 2008). "Bigland, Ralph (1712–1784)". Oxford Dictionary of National Biography. Oxford University Press. 
 Godfrey, Walter H.; Wagner, Anthony (1963). Survey of London, Monograph 16: College of Arms, Queen Victoria Street. London: Guild & School of Handicraft.
 Handley, Stuart (January 2008). "Anstis, John (1669–1744)". Oxford Dictionary of National Biography. Oxford University Press.
 Jacob, E. F. (ed.) (1937). The Register of Henry Chichele, Archbishop of Canterbury, 1414–1443 (Publications of the Canterbury and York Society, vol. 42). Oxford: Oxford University Press.
 Noble, Rev. Mark (1804). A History of the College of Arms and the Lives of All the Kings, Heralds and Pursuivants. London.
 Sherlock, Peter (2004). "Bysshe, Sir Edward (c.1610–1679)". Oxford Dictionary of National Biography. Oxford University Press.
 Stanford London, Hugh (1970). The Life of William Bruges (Publications of the Harleian Society, vol. 111–112). London: Harleian Society.
 Wagner, Anthony (1967). Heralds of England. London: Her Majesty's Majesty's Stationery Office.
 Wagner, Sir Anthony; Rowse, A. L. (1992). John Anstis: Garter King of Arms. London: Stationery Office.
 White, D. V. (May 2006). "Heard, Sir Isaac (1730–1822)". Oxford Dictionary of National Biography. Oxford University Press. 
 Woodcock, Thomas (2004a). "Burke, Sir (John) Bernard (1814–1892)", Oxford Dictionary of National Biography, Oxford University Press.
 Woodcock, Thomas (2004b). "Woods, Sir Albert William (1816–1904)". Oxford Dictionary of National Biography. Oxford University Press.
 Woodcock, Thomas (2004c). "Young, Sir Charles George (1795–1869)". Oxford Dictionary of National Biography. Oxford University Press.
 Woodcock, Thomas (January 2008a). "Nayler, Sir George (bap. 1764, d. 1831)", Oxford Dictionary of National Biography, Oxford University Press.
 Woodcock, Thomas (January 2008b). "St George, Sir Henry (1581–1644)". Oxford Dictionary of National Biography. Oxford University Press
 Yorke, Robert (2004a). "Barker, Sir Christopher (d. 1550)". Oxford Dictionary of National Biography. Oxford University Press.
 Yorke, Robert (2004b). "Wriothesley, Sir Thomas (d. 1534)". Oxford Dictionary of National Biography. Oxford University Press.

Further reading
 Elias Ashmole, The history of the most noble Order of the Garter (1715)
 J. Ferguson, English Diplomacy: 1422-1461 (Oxford: Clarendon Press, 1972)

External links
The College of Arms
Rights and Duties of Garter King of Arms from the Constitutions of the Officers of the Order of the Garter circa 1522

Offices of the College of Arms
Ceremonial officers in the United Kingdom